, also known mononymously as Haggar, is a fictional character in the Street Fighter shared universe, mainly playable in the Final Fight and Saturday Night Slam Masters series of video games. Haggar first appeared in the 1989 Capcom arcade game Final Fight and re-appeared in various other video game appearances.

Design and characteristics
Haggar is depicted in the original Final Fight wearing olive-colored trousers with brown shoes and a broad Sam Browne belt strapped over his right shoulder, which is the usual depiction of the character. Some games deviate slightly from this design. For example, in the Slam Masters series, he wears green tights with a red trim and brown wrestling boots. By the events of Final Fight 3, he is given a pony-tail hairstyle and wears green bicycle shorts as part of his outfit. Haggar is of Scottish descent, is classically trained in Scottish Backhold folk wrestling, and even keeps a Scottish flag hanging in his gym.

Appearances

In video games
Introduced as one of the three playable characters in Final Fight, Haggar is a former professional wrestler turned mayor of Metro City, which is plagued by the Mad Gear gang, the most dominant street gang in the city. After he refuses their bribe, they kidnap his daughter Jessica in hopes of forcing Haggar into a reluctant cooperation with them. Haggar recruits the help of Jessica's boyfriend Cody and their mutual friend Guy to rescue her and defeat the gang. Haggar later appeared in the sequel games of Final Fight, in which he battles against a revived Mad Gear in Final Fight 2 in order to rescue Guy's girlfriend and sensei, and fighting against the Skull Cross gang in Final Fight 3. He also appears in related titles such as Final Fight Revenge, in which he fights against members of Mad Gear while searching for his missing daughter, and Mighty Final Fight, which happens to be a parody of the original Final Fight. Haggar also appears in Final Fight: Streetwise as a retired mayor in charge of a boat repair shop and training gym, offering assistance to Cody's brother Kyle. While not playable in the game's story mode, he can be recruited as a temporary computer-controlled ally and is playable in the game's arcade mode. As such, Haggar is the only character to be playable in every Final Fight game.

Beyond the Final Fight series, Haggar appears as a playable character in a prequel series, Saturday Night Slam Masters and its two sequels, Muscle Bomber Duo and Ring of Destruction: Slam Masters 2. He was also intended to appear in the canceled 3D fighting game Capcom Fighting All-Stars as a selectable character, reprising his role as mayor to save Metro City from a bomb attack. He also appears as one of several playable characters in the crossover game Namco × Capcom, and as a character card in each of the SNK vs. Capcom: Card Fighters Clash titles. Haggar appears as the only playable Final Fight character in the crossover fighting games Marvel vs. Capcom 3: Fate of Two Worlds, Ultimate Marvel vs. Capcom 3, and Marvel vs. Capcom: Infinite.

Haggar has also made several cameo appearances such as in Alexs ending sequence for Capcom Fighting Evolution; in the backgrounds of Guy's Final Fight-inspired stages in Street Fighter Alpha 2, Street Fighter Alpha 3, and Super Street Fighter IV; Chun-Lis background in Super Puzzle Fighter II Turbo; as a costume for Frank West in Dead Rising 3 via downloadable content; nad with Zangief wearing his clothing as an alternate outfit in Street Fighter IV. Haggar made a brief appearance in one of the 2011 trailers for Street Fighter X Tekken where he gets beaten by King, and also appears within the game's "Mad Gear Hideout" stage, where he arrives during the final round of a match and attacks several Mad Gear members decked iout in ut ni kabuki attire before chasing fellow Final Fight character Sodom; this same stage reappears in Ultra Street Fighter IV, with Haggar once again making an appearance. In Street Fighter V, Haggar has passed down the mayor 'sposition to Cody. PBefore the game came out, the official Street Fighter Twitter page showed the letter Haggar wrote to Cody, who was about to take over fromhihm. Cody also has his clothing as an alternate outfit. In Lucia's story, the now-civilian Haggar goes to Lucia to inform her of rumors about a Mad Gear plot to eliminate Cody, asking her to investigate. Haggar is one of the few prominent character ssin he Final Fight series who has never been a playable character in the Street Fighter series.

In other media
Haggar appears in the American Street Fighter cartoon episode "Final Fight". While the plot followed that of the same arcade game, Haggar was unable to act against the Mad Gear gang due to them holding Jessica hostage, and instead recruited the help of Ryu and Ken to rescue her, along with Cody and Guy. He reappears at the conclusion of the episode to be reunited with his daughter, shortly before Mad Gear's defeat. Haggar makes occasional appearances in the Street Fighter comic series. Heaggar's backstory has been changed a little bit here. Before he became a politician, he is shown as both a professional wrestler and an action movie star. Haggar also appears as a mayor in the online flash cartoons Weebl and Bob's Team Laser Explosion, and as the protagonist in the stop-motion animation "A Sentinel in Metro City." Haggar also appears in the Final Fight fan film "The Broken Gear", portrayed by former professional wrestler and MMA fighter Don Frye.

Critical reception
Noted as the star of the Final Fight series, Haggar has been described as both iconic and one of the most unforgettable characters in gaming history. Haggar was named the best video game character of 1990 by Gamespot magazine, placing first in their top fifty characters list and appearing on the issue's cover, and later named the forty-fifth best character of 1993. In 2006, he was cited by Retro Gamer as one of the heroes of classic video gaming. In August 2009, GamesTM featured him in their "Hall of Fame", describing his character background as "wonderfully layered", with his aspects of being a father, a hard-working mayor, and former wrestler giving him "a sense of humanity" and "instantly memorable". They went on to state that without the character, the Final Fight series would not be as notable, calling Haggar "integral to its charm". Nintendo Power listed Mike Haggar as having one of the best mustaches.

Haggar has been called one of the best and most enjoyable characters to use in the Final Fight series by reviewers of the titles, and GamesRadar described him as "arguably the most beloved character to come out of the Final Fight series", expressing their wishes to see him appear in Super Street Fighter IV. He ranked third in Electronic Gaming Monthlys list of the top ten video game politicians, in which he was compared directly to former Minnesota governor and wrestler Jesse Ventura. Play further discussed Mike's position as a Metro City's major alongside his actions to the point of listing him in their "Top 8 Morally Neutral Characters On PS3" feature. In another article, Electronic Gaming Monthly praised the character's behavior and actions in Final Fight, citing him as their favorite aspect of Capcom Classics Collection and stating "You'd have to be a damn communist not to vote for this guy". IGN listed him as a character they hoped to see as an unlockable character in home ports of Street Fighter IV, noting his fighting style as "a perfect fit" for the title; they later named him one of their favorite wrestlers in video games. GameSpy named him one of the "25 Extremely Rough Brawlers" in video gaming, praising the brutality of his fighting style. GameDaily named Haggar one of their favorite Capcom characters of all time, placing him 18th on their "Top 25" list, and later named him one of their favorite heavily muscled characters in video games.

References

Bibliography
ALL ABOUT カプコン対戦格闘ゲーム 1987-2000 (All About Capcom Head-To-Head Fighting Game 1987-2000), 

Capcom protagonists
Characters designed by Akira Yasuda
Fictional characters from Manhattan
Fictional European-American people
Fictional mayors
Fictional sport wrestlers
Fictional professional wrestlers
Final Fight characters
Male characters in video games
Politician characters in video games
Video game characters introduced in 1989
Vigilante characters in video games